Steven Bert Bradley (born December 23, 1956) is a former American Major League Baseball pitcher. He played for the Oakland Athletics during the  season. Along with Rickey Henderson, Bradley was traded to the New York Yankees on December 5, 1984.

References
, or Retrosheet, or Pura Pelota

1956 births
Living people
Albany-Colonie Yankees players
Baseball players from Georgia (U.S. state)
BYU Cougars baseball players
Columbus Clippers players
Huntsville Stars players
Madison Muskies players
Major League Baseball pitchers
Minor league baseball coaches
Modesto A's players
Oakland Athletics players
Ogden A's players
Sportspeople from Athens, Georgia
Tacoma Tigers players
Tigres de Aragua players
American expatriate baseball players in Venezuela
Waterbury A's players
West Haven A's players
West Haven Whitecaps players
Baseball coaches from Georgia (U.S. state)
Lake Land Lakers baseball players
Baseball players from Illinois
People from Cumberland County, Illinois
Baseball coaches from Illinois